Zelotes tenuis is a species of ground spider in the family Gnaphosidae. It is found in a range from Mediterranean to Russia (Caucasus), has been introduced into Galapagos Islands, and the United States.

References

Gnaphosidae
Articles created by Qbugbot
Spiders described in 1866